James Wilkie Davidson (25 October 1873 – unknown) was a Scottish professional association footballer who played as an inside forward.

References

1873 births
Year of death unknown
Footballers from Edinburgh
Scottish footballers
Association football forwards
Celtic F.C. players
Burnley F.C. players
Lincoln City F.C. players
Tottenham Hotspur F.C. players
English Football League players